Goalball at the 2012 Summer Paralympics was held in London from 29 August to 9 September 2012.

Medalists

Qualifying

Men

Women

Men's tournament

Competition format
The twelve men's teams were divided into two equal groups for a single round robin group stage. The top four teams of each group advanced to the quarter finals. All matches in the second stage were knock-out format.

Group stage

Group A

Group B

Knockout round

Women's tournament

Competition format
The ten women's teams were divided into two equal groups for a single round robin group stage. The top four teams of each group advanced to the quarter finals. All matches in the second stage were knock-out format.

Group stage

Group C

Group D

Knockout round

Gallery

References

Africa-Oceania
Europe

External links
London 2012 Olympic and Paralympic Games 

 
2012
2012 Summer Paralympics events
Goalball in the United Kingdom